Midnight Choir is the debut album of the Norwegian band Midnight Choir, released 1994 on the Fjording label. The album stayed at the Norwegian VG-lista for five weeks in 1995, and reached #19 as peak position. The album was recorded and mixed at Loma Ranch Studio, Fredericksburg, Texas, during June and July 1994.

"Mercy on the Street", "Gypsy Rider", "Talk to Me" and "What Am I Worth to You?" were released as singles.

Track listing
 "Talk to Me" (Atle Byström) – 4:01
 "Don't Turn Out the Light" (Byström/R.C. Finnigan) – 4:37
 "Gypsy Rider" (Gene Clark) – 4:43
 "What Am I Worth to You?" (Byström/Finnigan) – 3:59
 "Turning of the Tide" (Richard Thompson) – 3:38
 "Hearts Gone Wild" (Katy Moffatt/Tom Russel) – 3:22
 "Mercy on the Street" (Byström/Finnigan) – 4:55
 "Rock Bottom" (Byström/Ron Olsen/Finnigan) – 3:42
 "Lonesome Drifter" (Byström/Paal Flaata/Finnigan) – 3:30
 "Lift Me Up" (Byström) – 4:02

Chart positions

Personnel

Musicians 
 Paal Flaata - Vocal, acoustic guitar
 Atle Byström - Acoustic and electric guitar, twelve-string guitar
 Ron Olsen - Bass guitar, double bass
 Tore Wildhauer - Drums, percussion
 Andrew Hardin - Electric and acoustic guitar, backing vocal, strings, castanets
 Richard Dee Purkeypile - Hammond organ on track #1
 Allison Young - Backing vocal
 Mike Hardwick - Acoustic guitar on track #3
 Leigh Harris - Backing vocal on track #4 and #10
 Paul Pearcy - Conga on track #4, percussion on track #5 and #10
 John Mills - Tenor saxophone on track #4 and #10
 Kent Winking - Trombone on track #4 and #10
 Keith Winking - Trumpet on track #4 and #10
 Brian Wood - Acoustic guitar on track #6
 Denice Franke - Backing vocal on track #6
 Mickey Merkens - Backing vocal on track #6

Production
 Andrew Hardin - Producer
 Lars Ulseth - Executive producer
 Tom Skjeklesæther - Executive producer
 John Hill - Mixer, recording
 Jerry Tubb - Mastering
 John Mills - Horn arrangements
 Raymond Mosken - Photo
 Bulldog design - Design

References

Midnight Choir albums
1994 debut albums